Goldhagen  is a surname. Notable people with the surname include:

 Daniel Goldhagen (born 1959), American writer and academic
 Shari Goldhagen, American writer

German-language surnames
Jewish surnames
Yiddish-language surnames